The Amateur Gentleman is a 1920 British drama film directed by Maurice Elvey and starring Langhorn Burton, Madge Stuart and Cecil Humphreys. The film is adapted from the 1913 novel The Amateur Gentleman by Jeffery Farnol.

Story filmed again in 1926 as The Amateur Gentleman starring Richard Barthelmess and in 1936 as The Amateur Gentleman starring Douglas Fairbanks, Jr.

Premise
In Regency Britain a young man tries to establish his father's innocence of an accused crime, by travelling to London disguised as a gentleman.

Cast
 Langhorn Burton ...  Barnabas Barty 
 Madge Stuart ...  Lady Cleone Meredith 
 Cecil Humphreys ...  Wilfred Chichester 
 Herbert Synott ...  John Barty 
 Pardoe Woodman ...  Ronald Barrymaine 
 Alfred Paumier ...  Prince Regent 
 Gerald McCarthy  ...  Viscount Horatio Debenham 
 Geoffrey Wilmer ...  Captain Slingsby 
 Sydney Seaward ...  Sir Mortimer Carnaby
 E. Vivian Reynolds ...  Jasper Gaunt 
 Dalton Somers ...  Natty Bell 
 Teddy Arundell ...  Digby Smivvle 
 Will Corrie ...  Captain Chumley 
 Judd Green ...  Jerry the Bosun

References

External links

1920 films
British historical drama films
British silent feature films
1920s English-language films
Films directed by Maurice Elvey
1920s historical drama films
Films set in London
Films set in the 1810s
British black-and-white films
Films based on British novels
Cultural depictions of George IV
1920 drama films
1920s British films
Silent drama films
Silent adventure drama films